Elzy A. Richards was a state legislator in Mississippi.

He represented Lowndes County, Mississippi in the Mississippi House of Representatives from 1872 to 1875.

See also
African-American officeholders during and following the Reconstruction era

References

Year of birth missing
Year of death missing
Place of birth missing
People from Lowndes County, Mississippi